Springhill may refer to:

Places

Canada 
 Springhill, Nova Scotia, a community in Cumberland County
 Springhill, Ontario, an unincorporated community in Champlain
 Springhill, a former hamlet now part of King City, Ontario

Malaysia 
 Bandar Springhill, a town in Negeri Sembilan

United Kingdom 
 Springhill (Bangor suburb), a suburb of Bangor, County Down, Northern Ireland
 Springhill, East Renfrewshire, a location in Scotland
 Springhill, Glasgow, a neighborhood of Glasgow, Scotland
 Springhill, Isle of Wight, a location in England
 Springhill, North Lanarkshire, a neighbourhood of Shotts, Scotland
 Springhill, Lichfield, a location in Staffordshire, England
 Springhill, South Staffordshire, Staffordshire, England
 Springhill House, Northern Ireland, a notable house and estate in Moneymore, County Londonderry

United States 
 Springhill, Alabama
 Springhill, Faulkner County, Arkansas
 Springhill, Indiana
 Springhill, Louisiana
 Springhill, Missouri
 Springhill, Montana

Other uses 
 Springhill (TV series), a drama series made by Granada Television
 SpringHill Entertainment, a video production company founded by LeBron James and Maverick Carter

See also
 Springhill mining disaster, any of three mining disasters in different mines near the community of Springhill, Nova Scotia
 Tel Aviv, a city whose name translates to "Spring Hill"
Spring Hill (disambiguation)
Springhills, a locality in the central Southland region of New Zealand's South Island
Springhills, Ohio